Jean Emile Serisier (1824 – 10 February 1880) was a French-born Australian storekeeper and vigneron who helped found the city of Dubbo, New South Wales.

Birth
He was born in Bordeaux to shipping broker Emile Alexander Serisier and Rose Marie Mayou.

Career
He came to New South Wales in 1838 as a midshipman; ill health saw him in the care of a merchant called Despointes. In 1847 he tried to set up a store at Dubbo but was refused permission by Robert Dulhunty, who owned the station. He petitioned for a village nearby, and bought several blocks in 1851. He ran a general store for Despointes, and also became local postmaster in 1855. He married Margaret Humphreys on 1 March 1858, with whom he had five children. He was returning officer for the Bogan electorate, and from 1862 was a magistrate. He ran unsuccessfully for the Legislative Assembly in 1872 and 1877. He sold his general store in 1873 (having acquired it from Despointes in the meantime), and subsequently ran a vineyard at his Emulga property. He died while visiting France in 1880.

References

1824 births
1880 deaths
Settlers of New South Wales